The Airbus A220 is a family of five-abreast narrow-body airliners by Airbus Canada Limited Partnership. It was originally designed by Bombardier and had two years in service as the Bombardier CSeries. 

The program was launched on 13 July 2008, the smaller A220-100 (formerly CS100) made its maiden flight on 16 September 2013, was awarded an initial type certification by Transport Canada on 18 December 2015, and entered service on 15 July 2016 with launch operator Swiss Global Air Lines. The longer A220-300 (formerly CS300) first flew on 27 February 2015, received an initial type certification on 11 July 2016, and entered service with airBaltic on 14 December 2016.

In July 2018, the aircraft was rebranded as the A220 after Airbus acquired a 50.01% stake in the program through a joint venture established in 2016. In August 2019, a second final assembly line opened at Airbus Mobile in Alabama, supplementing the main facility in Mirabel, Quebec. In February 2020, Airbus increased its share to 75% as Bombardier exited the program, while the Quebec government's Investissement Québec held the 25% balance.

Powered by Pratt & Whitney PW1500G geared turbofan engines under its wings, the twinjet features fly-by-wire flight controls, a carbon composite wing, an aluminium-lithium fuselage and optimised aerodynamics for better fuel efficiency.

Both launch operators recorded better-than-expected fuel burn and dispatch reliability, as well as positive feedback from passengers and crew.
, the global A220 fleet had completed more than 680,000 flights over 1,100,000 block hours without accidents.

The 35 m (115 ft) long A220-100 seats 108 to 133, while the 38.7 m (127 ft) long A220-300 seats 130 to 160.
The ACJ TwoTwenty is the business jet version of the A220-100, launched in late 2020.

The A220 family complements the A319neo in the Airbus range and competes with the largest variants of the Embraer E-Jet E2 family and the smaller Boeing 737 MAX-7 variant. 

, a total of 785 A220s had been ordered of which 251 had been delivered and were all in commercial service with 16 operators. Delta Air Lines is the largest operator with 59 aircraft in its fleet.

Development

BRJ-X forerunner concept

Fokker was the manufacturer of the 100-seat Fokker 100 short-haul aircraft. On 5 February 1996, Bombardier began discussions with Fokker about acquiring that company's assets, but after evaluating the potential purchase, Bombardier announced an end to the talks on 27 February. On 15 March, Fokker was declared bankrupt.

On 8 September 1998, Bombardier then launched the BRJ-X, or "Bombardier Regional Jet eXpansion", a larger regional jet than the Canadair Regional Jet due to enter service in 2003. Instead of 2–2 seating, the BRJ-X was to have a wider fuselage with 2–3 seating for 85 to 110 passengers, and underwing engine pods. It was abutting the smallest narrow-body jetliners, like the 2–3 DC-9/MD-80/Boeing 717 or the 3–3 Airbus A318 and Boeing 737-500/737-600. At the end of 2000, the project was shelved by Bombardier in favour of stretching the CRJ700 into the CRJ900.

Meanwhile, Embraer launched its four-abreast, under-wing powered E-jets for 70 to 122 passengers at the Paris Air Show in June 1999, which made its maiden flight in February 2002 and was introduced in 2004. Airbus launched its 107–117 passengers A318 shrink on 21 April 1999, which made its first flight in January 2002, as Boeing had the 737-600 first delivered in September 1998.

CSeries feasibility study

Bombardier appointed Gary Scott on 8 March 2004 to evaluate the creation of a New Commercial Aircraft Program. Bombardier launched a feasibility study for a five-seat abreast CSeries at Farnborough Airshow in July 2004 to investigate development of an aircraft to replace rival manufacturers' aging DC-9/MD-80, Fokker 100, Boeing 737 Classic and BAe-146 with 20% lower operating costs, and 15% lower than aircraft produced at the time. The smaller version should carry 110 to 115 passengers and the larger 130 to 135 passengers over 3,200 nautical miles.

Bombardier's Board of Directors authorized marketing the CSeries on 15 March 2005, seeking firm commitments from potential customers, suppliers and government partners prior to program launch. The aircraft would have 3-by-2 standard seating and 4-abreast business class,  stand-up headroom, fly-by-wire and side stick controls. 20 percent of the airframe weight would be in composite materials for the centre and rear fuselages, tail cone, empennage and wings. The first flight was planned for 2008 and entry into service for 2010.

In May 2005, the CSeries development was evaluated at US$2.1 billion, shared with suppliers and partner governments for one-third each. The Government of Canada would invest US$262.5 million, the Government of Quebec US$87.5 million and the Government of the United Kingdom US$340 million (£180 million), repayable on a royalty basis per aircraft. The UK contribution is part of an investment partnership for the location of the development of the wings, engine nacelles and composite empennage structures at the Belfast plant, where Bombardier bought Short Brothers in 1989.

On 31 January 2006, Bombardier announced that market conditions could not justify the launch of the program, and that the company would reorient CSeries project efforts, team and resources to regional jet and turboprop aircraft. A small team of employees were kept to develop the CSeries business plan and were further tasked to include other risk-sharing partners in the program.

On 31 January 2007, Bombardier announced that work on the aircraft would continue, with entry into service planned for 2013.

Program launch

On 22 February 2008, Bombardier's Board of Directors authorized offering formal sales proposals of the CSeries to airline customers, on the strength of its 20% better fuel burn and up to 15% better cash operating costs compared to similarly sized aircraft produced at the time. This interested Lufthansa, Qatar Airways and ILFC.

On 13 July 2008, in a press conference on the eve of the opening of the Farnborough Airshow, Bombardier Aerospace formally launched the CSeries, with a letter of interest from Lufthansa for 60 aircraft, including 30 options, at a US$46.7 million list price. The final assembly of the aircraft would be done in Mirabel, wings would be developed and manufactured in Belfast and the aft fuselage and cockpit would be manufactured in Saint-Laurent, Quebec. The center fuselage was to be built by China Aviation Industry Corporation (AVIC)'s affiliate Shenyang Aircraft Corporation. Bombardier estimated the market for the 100- to 149-seat market segment of the CSeries to be 6,300 units over 20 years, representing more than $250 billion revenue over the next 20 years; the company expects to capture up to half of this market.

Prototype manufacturing 

In March 2009, Bombardier redesignated the C110 and C130 as CS100 and CS300, respectively. The models were offered in standard- and extended-range (ER) variants; and additionally, an extra thrust (XT) variant of the CS300 was also offered. Bombardier subsequently settled on a single variant, with extended range becoming the new standard. By November, the first wing had been assembled at the Bombardier Aerostructures and Engineering Services (BAES) site in Belfast, Northern Ireland, while the program grew to about $3.5 billion, shared with suppliers and governments.
In the same month, construction of a composite wing manufacturing facility at the Belfast site started and the first flight of the CSeries was expected by 2012.

In March 2009, Bombardier confirmed major suppliers: Alenia Aeronautica for the composite horizontal and vertical stabilisers, Fokker Elmo for the wiring and interconnection systems and Goodrich Corporation Actuation Systems: design and production of the flap and slat actuation systems. By June 2009, 96% of billable materials had been allocated, with the company settling on various companies for remaining components and systems: Shenyang Aircraft Corporation for the centre fuselage; Zodiac Aerospace for the interiors, and United Technologies Corporation for the engine nacelles, Liebherr for the landing gear and pneumatics; UTC Aerospace for the electrical system and lighting; Goodrich for the nacelle; Meggitt for the wheels and brakes; Michelin for the tires; Spirit for the pylons; Honeywell for the APU; and PPG supplies the windows. 
In 2010, Ghafari Associates was retained to develop the Montreal manufacturing site to accommodate the aircraft production.

The CSeries competed with the smaller variants of the A320 family aircraft. Airbus opted to compete aggressively against the CSeries rather than ignoring it, as Boeing had done with Airbus. Airbus dropped the A320's price in head-to-head competition, successfully blocking Bombardier from several deals. The 2010 order for 40 CS300s and 40 options from Republic Airways Holdings then owner of exclusive A319/320 operator Frontier Airlinesalso pushed Airbus into the A320neo re-engine.

In January 2010, Bombardier was about to reach the design freeze for the CSeries and announced that CS100 deliveries were planned to start in 2013, and CS300 deliveries would follow a year later. In November 2011, Bombardier expected a second-half 2012 first flight as it was to receive the first fuselage package until mid-2012 at the earliest and Pratt & Whitney still had "a little bit more work to do" to meet the requirement. In June 2012, Bombardier reaffirmed the first flight should happen before the year's end with subsequent entry into service remaining 2013.
In November, Bombardier said that some areas of the program were late due to unspecified supplier issues, and announced a delay of six months to both the first flight to June 2013 and entry into service of the CS100 one year later.

An extensive program update was presented on 7 March 2013; the first "flight test vehicle" (FTV) was displayed in a near-complete state, along with three other FTVs in various states of assembly: one such FTV confirmed the 160 seat "Extra Capacity" version of the CS300, featuring two sets of over-wing emergency exits. The first FTV's electrical system was powered up in March, while tests on the static airframe proceeded satisfactorily and on schedule. In June, Bombardier again delayed the first flight into July on account of software upgrades and final ground testing. On 24 July, after a protracted system integration process, the first flight was delayed into "the coming weeks". On 30 August, Bombardier received the flight test permit from Transport Canada, granting permission to perform high speed taxi testing and flight testing.

Flight testing 

On 16 September 2013, the CS100 made its maiden flight from Mirabel Airport. Over 14,000 data points were gathered on this flight; after reconfiguration and software upgrades, FTV1 flew for the second time on 1 October. On 16 January 2014, the planned entry-into-service date was delayed into the second half of 2015 due to certification testing issues; the CS300 remained set to follow approximately six months after the CS100.

On 29 May 2014, one of the four FTVs suffered an uncontained engine failure. Consequently, flight testing was suspended until an investigation could be completed. The incident kept Bombardier from displaying the CSeries at one of the most important aerospace events in that year, the biennial Farnborough Airshow. In August, Bombardier changed the program's management and slashed its workforce. On 7 September, flight testing was resumed after the engine problem had been isolated to a fault in the lubrication system. Bombardier chairman Laurent Beaudoin stated that the CSeries was then expected to be in service in 2016. Delays resulted in order cancellations, including from the Swedish lessor.

By 20 February 2015, the FTVs had accumulated over 1,000 flight hours. Seven days later, the CS300 prototype took off for its maiden flight from Bombardier's facility at Montreal Mirabel International airport in Quebec. Test flight results surpassed the company's guarantees for noise, economics and performance, meaning a longer range than advertised could be possible. The fifth CS100 first flew on 18 March. On 27 March, Bombardier confirmed that Canadian certification for the CS100 should come in late 2015 with entry into service in 2016.

At the 2015 Paris Air Show, Bombardier released updated performance data, showing improvements over the initial specifications. On 20 August, Bombardier disclosed that the CS100 had completed over 80% of the required certification tests. On 14 October, the company had completed over 90% of required tests for the CS100. Accordingly, Bombardier announced that the first production CS100 would soon commence function and reliability tests. The CS100 completed its certification testing program in mid-November. On 25 November, Bombardier completed the first phase of its route proving capabilities, with a 100% dispatch reliability. The final prototype, FTV8, the second CS300 with a complete interior, made its first flight on 3 March 2016.

Government support 
In 2015 Bombardier offered to sell a majority stake in the CSeries programme to Airbus. In October 2015, Airbus confirmed that it had turned down Bombardier's offer. Bombardier said it would explore alternatives. Just days prior, the Government of Quebec reiterated its willingness to provide Bombardier with financial aid, if it were requested. Bombardier stated its commitment to the CSeries and that it had the financial resources to support it.
On 29 October, Bombardier took a  write-down on the CSeries. The Trudeau government indicated that it would reply to Bombardier's request for $350 million in assistance after it took power in early November. On the same day, the Quebec government invested  in the company to save the struggling programme. In early November, a Scotiabank report indicated that the company and the programme would probably need a second bailout, and that even then the CSeries would probably not make money.

In April 2016, Bombardier reportedly requested a  aid package from the Canadian Government. The Government then offered an aid package without divulging the amount or conditions imposed, though some media reported that the company initially rejected the offer.
By July 2016, Bombardier Aerospace set up the C Series Aircraft Limited Partnership (CSALP) together with Investissement Québec.

Certification 

The smallest model in the series, the 110- to 125-seat CS100, received type certification from Transport Canada on 18 December 2015, and simultaneously from US Federal Aviation Administration (FAA) and European Aviation Safety Agency (EASA) in June 2016, clearing the way for delivery to the launch operator, Swiss International Air Lines, by the end of the month.
At the time of CS100 certification by Transport Canada in December 2015, the CSeries had 250 firm orders and letters of intent, plus commitments for another 360, mostly for the CS300.
The largest model, the 130- to 145-seat CS300, obtained its type certificate from Transport Canada on 11 July 2016, from the EASA on 7 October that cleared the delivery to its launch customer airBaltic by November 2016, and from the FAA on 14 December 2016.
Both models were awarded a common type rating on 23 November 2016 simultaneously from Transport Canada and EASA, allowing pilots to qualify on both types interchangeably.

In March 2017, Bombardier conducted steep 5.5˚ approach landings tests at London City Airport (LCY), and announced one month later, April 2017, that the CS100 received Transport Canada and EASA steep approach certification.

On 1 July 2018, the Airbus partnership took effect and the aircraft was rebranded A220. In December 2018, the EASA approved Category IIIa/IIIb instrument approaches for autoland with no decision height but runway visibility minimum requirements.

In January 2019, A220 powered with PW1500G gained ETOPS 180 approval from Transport Canada, allowing direct routes over water or remote regions. The A220 was the first commercial airliner to obtain domestic ETOPS certification from Transport Canada.

In July 2021, the EASA had officially approved an increase in the A220-300's maximum seating to 149 passengers, subject to a modification on an overwing exit slide.
In September 2021, Airbus entered into talks with the Civil Aviation Administration (CAA) of China over the certification of the A220 in order to enter the large Chinese aviation market, particularly in the western part of the country. In November 2022, Airbus was working to certify the A220-300 for 160 passengers.

Production 

In 2016, Bombardier achieved its goal of delivering seven CSeries aircraft to both launch operators, Swiss and airBaltic. Production was then set to ramp to 30–35 aircraft deliveries in 2017 after PW1500G engine supply and start issues were resolved. However, the CSeries delivery goal for 2017 had to be revised to 20–22 aircraft only, due to persistent engine delivery delays, and finally, only 17 deliveries were completed in the year.
At the programme launch, Bombardier had forecast 315 annual deliveries from 2008 to 2027 for 100- to 150-seat airliners, but in the first 10.5 years, the six models available (B737-700, A318/A319, CS100/CS300 and E195) averaged fewer than 80 per year.
A total of 37 CSeries had been delivered before the Airbus partnership took effect on 1 July 2018 and the aircraft was rebranded A220.

Airbus targeted over 100 orders of A220 in 2018 and 3,000 over 20 years, half of the 100- to 150-seat market, and needed a supply chain cost reduction over 10%. Airbus then sought to reduce costs from all suppliers, including Bombardier, wing builder Short Brothers and engine manufacturer Pratt & Whitney. It has reportedly pushed its suppliers to lower their prices by 20% for more volume, or to switch them, towards 150 yearly deliveries. Supplier costs could be cut by 30–40% by Airbus's market power, as a 10% procurement costs decrease would add six gross margin points to the programme. Airbus waited to win several new orders before increasing pressure on suppliers and catching their attention in 2019 with the sale of 135 A220s to U.S. airlines, including a follow-up order from Delta.

In mid-2018, Airbus CFO predicted a production potential of more than 100 A220 per year. Delivery rates continued to climb with the new brand, reaching a total output of 33 in 2018, and then rising to 48 A220 in 2019. The market share was split between 80% A220-300 (former CS300) and 20% A220-100 (former CS100).

The groundbreaking ceremony for the $300 million final assembly line (FAL) at the Airbus Mobile plant in Mobile, Alabama was held on 16 January 2019; on this occasion Airbus confirmed its confidence that there is enough demand to justify two assembly sites and that the airliner can be profitable. On 5 August 2019, production started at the Mobile facility, which was not due to be finished until 2020; work started early to ensure that the first delivery schedule could be met.

The removal of Bombardier's financial constraints in February 2020 gave Airbus greater latitude for further investment in the programme, which will be needed to ramp up production rates, though this will push back the break-even point of the programme to the mid-2020s.
The program cost was US$ 7 billion.
On 2 June 2020, the first A220 produced in Alabama completed its first flight. By that date, production of the first aircraft for JetBlue Airways had also started. The first US-assembled A220 aircraft, an A220-300, was delivered to Delta on 22 October 2020.

In January 2021, as Airbus reviewed its production rates following a shift in demand away from wide-bodies affected by the COVID-19 pandemic, the A220 was expected to reach a production rate of five aircraft per month by the end of the first quarter as previously foreseen.
In May 2021, Airbus targeted a production rate of six per month from early 2022, and intends to reach 14 (ten in Quebec and four in Alabama) per month by the middle of the decade to be profitable.

On 10 January 2022, Airbus introduced the A220 pre-FAL, a U-shaped pre-assembly line with four stations used for preparatory work and seven for the actual equipping, in order to install systems earlier, stabilising the production process. The equipped fuselage sections are then moved to the FAL in Mirabel or in Mobile at a rate of six per month as of November 2022.

Boeing dumping petition

Airbus partnership 

The stiff competition, slow business and ultimately the dumping petition by Boeing paved the way for Bombardier to close a partnership with Airbus in October 2017. Bombardier CEO predicted that the partnership would significantly accelerate sales as it would bring certainty to the CSeries programme and increase the level of confidence through the Airbus's global scale, which would take the programme to new heights.

On 16 October 2017, Airbus and Bombardier announced that Airbus would acquire a 50.01% majority stake in the CSALP partnership, with Bombardier keeping 31% and Investissement Québec 19%, to expand in an estimated market of more than 6,000 new 100- to 150-seat aircraft over 20 years. Airbus did not pay for its share in the programme, nor did it assume any debt. Its supply chain expertise should save production costs but headquarters and assembly remain in Québec while U.S. customers would benefit from a second assembly line in Mobile, Alabama. This transaction was subject to regulatory approvals then expected to be completed in 2018. While assembling the aircraft in U.S. could circumvent the 292% duties proposed in the dumping petition by Boeing, Airbus CEO Tom Enders and Bombardier CEO Alain Bellemare assured that this factor did not drive the partnership, but negotiations began in August 2017 after the April filing and the June decision to proceed and, as a result, Boeing was suspicious. Leahy considered that Boeing indirectly forced the CSeries programme into Airbus hands by pressing the U.S. administration for massive tariffs on the aircraft.

Airbus insisted that it had no plan to buy out Bombardier's stake in the program and that Bombardier would remain a strategic partner after 2025, however clauses allowed it to buy out Investissement Quebec's share in 2023 and Bombardier's 7 years after the deal closes, though production is required to remain in Quebec until at least 2041. AirInsight anticipated that the CSeries market share of the 100- to 149-seat market over 20 years will increase from 40% of 5,636 aircraft ( sales) to 55–60%, around 3,010 aircraft, through Airbus' corporate strength. It was later planned to rebrand the CSeries as an Airbus model, with A200 suggested as a family name and A210/A230 for the CS100 and CS300.

In November 2017, Embraer assured at the Dubai Airshow that it would monitor Airbus involvement until antitrust immunity was granted, for dumping pricing after, and that Brazil would sue Canada for its subsidies to Bombardier through the World Trade Organization. Embraer also believed supply chain costs could not be reduced enough to make the CSeries profitable, viewing it as heavy, expensive and adapted to long, thin routes exceeding the range of E-jet E2, a close rival for market share.

In October 2017, Boeing was reportedly concerned over its ability to match fleet package deals enabled by the partnership. In December 2017, The Wall Street Journal reported Boeing was planning to offer Embraer more than the company's $3.7 billion market value in order to establish a joint venture. Aviation industry analysts saw that deal as a reaction to the partnership. The Boeing–Embraer joint venture was announced in February 2019, with the deal expected to close in June 2020 following antitrust investigations, but Boeing terminated the agreement in April 2020 due to impact of the 2019–20 coronavirus pandemic on aviation.

During competition investigation, Airbus and Bombardier were to operate separately and clean teams with privileged access to competitively sensitive data but separated from their management planned the integration, evaluating synergies and preparing communications to regulators. Antitrust approval aimed at finalisation by summer 2018 Farnborough Air Show to allow a marketing push.

On 8 June 2018, after regulatory approval, the partners announced that Airbus would take a majority stake on 1 July 2018. The head office, leadership team and primary final assembly line (FAL) would stay in Mirabel, Quebec, with its workforce of 2,200. The secondary  in Mobile would start deliveries in 2020 with a monthly production rate of four, rising to six for a capacity of eight while the main Mirabel FAL could go to ten. Bombardier would fund the cash shortfalls if required, up to US$ million from the second half of 2018 to 2021.

It was intended that the programme team would be formed by leaders from both Bombardier and Airbus and headed by Philippe Balducchi, then Head of Performance Management at Airbus Commercial Aircraft. Ten days after programme control was transferred to Airbus, the aircraft was rebranded as the A220-100/300. Later, on 1 June 2019, the CSALP joint venture was renamed to Airbus Canada Limited Partnership and adopted the Airbus logo as its sole visual identity.

Bombardier exit 
After reassessing its participation in January 2020, Bombardier exited the A220 programme in February 2020, selling its share to Airbus for $591 million. Airbus thus owned 75% of the programme; the remaining 25% of shares were held by Investissement Québec. Under the acquisition terms Airbus acquired Bombardier's option to buy out Investissement Québec's share from 2023, with a revised option date of 2026. Airbus also agreed to acquire A220 and A330 work package production capabilities from Bombardier in Saint-Laurent, to be taken through the Airbus subsidiary, Stelia Aerospace.

Airbus and the government of Quebec agreed in February 2022 to invest a further $1.2b in Airbus Canada, to support the acceleration of the A220 production rate to 14 A220s per month. Accordingly, Airbus would invest $900m into the aircraft programme and Investissement Québec $300m, allowing the partnership to continue until the programme becomes profitable in the middle of the decade. To protect Quebec's investment until it matured, the new earliest date Airbus could acquire the remainder of the shares thus became 2030.

Stretched variant 
In January 2010, JP Morgan reported that Bombardier was considering a 150-seat version of the CSeries; Bombardier described the report as speculative. At the Farnborough Airshow in July 2012, Bombardier started discussions with AirAsia about a proposed 160-seat configuration for the CS300. Consequently, by November 2012, this configuration was included in the CS300 project, although AirAsia rejected the proposal.

In May 2015, The Wall Street Journal reported that Bombardier was considering marketing a CS500, a further stretch of the CS300, to compete with the 160- to 180-seat versions of the Boeing 737 and A320 airliners, but was uncommitted. The existing wing would be capable of supporting a stretched version. After the Airbus partnership in 2018, a stretched A220-500 would allow Airbus to enlarge its A320-family replacement to better compete with the proposed Boeing New Midsize Airplane. In January 2019, Airbus hinted that a larger A220 variant could be developed, owing to ramped-up production and market demand for the current production models. However, in June 2019, Airbus indicated that it would not consider launching an A220-500 until it has solved its A220 production issues, and definitely not in the following year.

Speculation about a stretched variant continued in November 2019, with Air France mentioning an A220-500 during an investor briefing on its modernisation strategy. In December 2020, Air France said it would consider the Boeing 737 MAX and the A321 as alternatives if the A220-500 is not developed in time.
In January 2022, Luxembourg flag carrier Luxair expressed interest in the A220-500 as the airline sought to simplify its operations and avoid operating a mixed fleet of narrow-body aircraft, similarly to airBaltic, which was also said to be looking forward to the stretched variant to complement its A220-300 fleet, while Breeze Airways eyed a longer-range variant.
In the same month, following Allegiant Air's decision to walk away from the A220, due in part to the uncertainty surrounding the launch of the A220-500, Airbus Chief Commercial Officer Christian Scherer said the stretched A220 variant was planned, although it was not an agenda item for a short-term decision.

In July 2022, Airbus solicited an engine proposal from Pratt & Whitney and CFM International as a possible second supplier for the newly stretched variant, as well as the existing variants.
In September, Airbus CEO Guillaume Faury signalled to investors at Capital Markets Day that a stretched variant is necessary to increase the A220 family's share of the narrowbody market, adding, "but we don't want to be right too early". The A220-500 could be launched only once the production is geared up and the programme is profitable. If launched in 2025, it would enter service in 2028-2029 and Airbus could accept the risk for the A320neo backlog, more so as Boeing is not expected to launch a new narrowbody before 2030.

Performance improvements 
After beating performance promises by 3%, performance improvement packages shaving operating costs were previously studied by Bombardier before the Airbus partnership; these could include putting doors on the exposed main wheels, reducing drag but adding weight and complexity. Two to three more seats could be added by moving the aft lavatory, without reducing the seat pitch.

With the Airbus ruleset ( passengers with bags, 3% enroute reserve,  alternate and 30 minutes hold), the 108-seat A220-100 could reach  and the 130-seat A220-300 would achieve a range of  while being limited by its fuel capacity. With a denser economy seating at a 30-inch pitch down from 32, a 116-seat A220-100 would still reach  and a 141-seat A220-300 would exceed .

In February 2020, Airbus announced an increase in payload capacity, achieved through a  increase in the maximum zero-fuel weight and maximum landing weight of both the -100 and the -300, to be introduced as an option from 2022.

Business jet (ACJ TwoTwenty) 
On 17 May 2021, the first section of the ACJ TwoTwenty, the mid-fuselage section, had arrived at the A220 Final Assembly Line in Mirabel within the programme time frame and marked the start of the first Airbus corporate jet ever assembled in Canada.
The business jet made its first flight on 14 December 2021, before delivery to Comlux to be outfitted with a VIP cabin in Indianapolis.

Design 
The Airbus A220 family is a single-aisle airliner originally developed by Bombardier as the CSeries, targeting the 100- to 150-seat market between regional airliners and mainline airliners.

Efficiency claims 

Airbus states that the structural technology, aerodynamic design, ultra-high bypass geared turbofan engine, and state-of-the-art flight control and systems together can save up to 25% fuel burn per seat, 25%  and 50% NOx emissions, as well as provide a 25% reduction in maintenance costs and operating cost per seat compared to previous airliners in the same class, plus a reduced noise footprint with a 18 EPNdB margin to chapter 4 noise limits.

Cockpit 

The cockpit features the Rockwell Collins Pro Line Fusion avionics suite, which incorporates five  displays along with comprehensive navigation, communications, surveillance, engine-indicating and crew-alerting system (EICAS), electronic checklist, aircraft maintenance systems, and can be equipped with head-up displays. Other elements of the avionics and other subsystems include Parker Hannifin's flight control, fuel and hydraulics systems; Liebherr Aerospace's air management system; and United Technologies Corporation's air data system, flap and slat actuation systems. The cockpit includes a dual flight management system, multi-scan weather radar, fly-by-wire flight controls with full envelope protection & speed stabilisation, Cat IIIa Autoland, and side-stick controllers. The cockpit layout is common to the -100 and the -300 variants, enabling pilots to fly either variant with the same type rating.

Cabin 

The rotating overhead bins offers  of storage per passenger to allow one carry-on bag per passenger. Lavatories have improved accessibility for passengers with reduced mobility. Two flex zones allow modular cabin elements such as stowage areas and partitions to be customised. The cabin is lighted naturally through  windows at every seat row and artificially by customisable colour LEDs. The aircraft offers overhead video display, wireless content distribution and Ku band connectivity, and can be equipped with in-flight-entertainment. The onboard environment, entertainment offerings and mood lighting are controlled via an integrated cabin management system. 
It has a  higher ceiling as well as 20% larger luggage bins than other aircraft in its class. The seat is 2.5 cm wider than the Airbus A320 and 5.0 cm wider than the Boeing 737.

Airframe

Commonality between both variants of the A220 family is over 99%. To support higher loads, the A220-300's wing and centre wing box are structurally reinforced, as is the centre fuselage, which is  longer than the -100 variant, and the main landing gear. Extensive use of aluminium–lithium in the fuselage, and carbon composite in wings, empennage, rear fuselage section, and engine nacelles reduces weight and increases corrosion resistance, resulting in better maintainability. The overall airframe consists of 70% advanced lightweight materials, comprising 46% composite materials and 24% aluminium–lithium. The aircraft features a low drag nose and tailcone design, minimum fuselage wetted area and optimised wing aerodynamics.

Landing gear
The nose landing gear is common for both variants, while the -300 main landing gear is slightly reinforced. The -100 has three pairs of disc brakes, the -300 one more.

Engine

The A220 is powered by two Pratt & Whitney PW1500G underwing turbofans. Its geared turbofan architecture and advanced engine core improves efficiency and reduces the stage and parts count. The PW1500G has a 20 dB margin to Chapter IV noise limits, and high-efficiency components and advanced combustor technologies reduce  and NOx emissions. It was certified in February 2013, the first variant in the PW1000G range. The PW1500G is the turbofan engine with the highest bypass ratio at 12:1. Each engine can produce 84.5 to 104 kN (19,000 to 23,300 lbf) of thrust flat rated at ISA + 15°C.
The engine was designed to reach 12% better fuel economy.

Operational history 
The all-new aircraft entered service as CSeries in the first two years, and was then rebranded as A220 following the Airbus partnership in 2018.

CSeries 

 2016
The first CSeries, a CS100, was delivered to Swiss Global Air Lines on 29 June 2016 at Montréal–Mirabel International Airport, and began commercial service on 15 July with a flight between Zürich and Paris. The launch operator stated in August, that "the customer feedback is very positive with the expected remarks concerning the bright cabin, reduced noise, enough leg room and space for hand luggage as well as the comfortable seats. Also, the feedback from our pilots is gratifying. They especially like the intuitive flying experience." The first CS300 was delivered to AirBaltic on 28 November, and began revenue service on 14 December with a flight from Riga to Amsterdam in a 145-seat two-class configuration. The type launch operator lauded lower noise levels for passengers and more space for luggage than its Boeing 737-300s.

Upon introduction, both variants were performing above their original specifications and the CS300 range was 2% better than the brochure, as were its per seat and per trip cost. airBaltic reported a 2600 L/h fuel consumption against 3000 L/h for its Boeing 737-300 with similar capacity, and stated 21% better fuel efficiency. Fuel burn was more than 1% lower than the marketing claims and Bombardier would update its performance specifications later in 2017. The CSeries was 25% cheaper to fly than the replaced aircraft at Swiss, the Avro RJ100. On long missions, the CS100 was up to 1% more fuel efficient than the brochure and the CS300 up to 3%. The CS300 burned 20% less fuel than the Airbus A319, 21% less than the 737 Classic while the CS100 18 to 27% less per seat than the Avro RJ. The CS300 is  lighter than the Airbus A319neo and nearly  lighter than the Boeing 737 MAX 7, helping it to achieve up to 12% operating costs savings.

 2017
After 28,000 engine hours in 14 in-service aircraft with a powerplant dispatch reliability of 99.9%, Swiss replaced an engine pair in May 2017 after 2,400 hours, while AirBaltic replaced another one in June. Swiss initially flew six sectors a day and by July 2017 up to nine a day with an average time of 1 hours 15 minutes. Air Baltic's flight length averaged 3 hours, and the average fleet daily usage was 14 hours. In September 2017, over 1.5 million passengers had 16,000 revenue flights in the 18 aircraft in service, making up to 100 revenue flights per day on 100 routes: most used were up to 17 hours per day and up to 10 legs per day. Thirty-five minute turnarounds allowed 11 legs per day.

On 8 August 2017, following the steep approach certification by EASA, Swiss completed its first revenue flight to London City from Zurich, replacing the Avro RJ.
As of September 2017, the CSeries fleet had undergone 20 A Checks with no significant maintenance issues.

On 22 December 2017, after months of engine delivery delays, Korean Air became the third airline to take delivery of a CSeries. On 20 January 2018, Korean Air made their first revenue flight with the CS300, from Seoul to Ulsan.
Korean Air received its second in early January 2018 and the remaining eight aircraft were to be delivered later in 2018.
As of June 2018, Air Baltic reached a maximum utilisation of 18.5 hours a day.

A220 

 2018
On 1 July 2018, the partnership came into effect and the first aircraft with Airbus branding, an A220-300 (former CS300), was delivered to airBaltic on 20 July 2018. 
On 26 October 2018, Delta Air Lines received its first A220-100 (former CS100) of its order for 75, which was previously disputed by Boeing. On 7 February 2019, Delta operated its maiden A220-100 flight with service from New York–LaGuardia Airport to Dallas–Fort Worth. 
On 21 December 2018, Air Tanzania received its first A220, a -300, to be based in Dar es Salaam.

 2019
As of June 2019, the launch operator, Swiss Air Lines successfully completed C checks on its A220 fleet, performed by SAMCO Aircraft Maintenance in its MRO facilities at Maastricht Airport.
On 6 September 2019, Egyptair received its first A220 of its order for 12, a -300 with 140 seats: 15 premium and 125 economy seats. Its final A220-300 was delivered on 5 October 2020.
On 29 November 2019, the 100th A220, an A220-300, was delivered to the type launch operator, airBaltic. At that time the airline operated the longest flight by an A220 – a 6.5-hour flight from Riga to Abu Dhabi. That year, airBaltic became the first airline capable of providing a full scope of maintenance for the A220-300.
On 20 December 2019, Air Canada received its first A220-300 of its order for 45. Air Canada began A220 flights on 16 January 2020 between Calgary and Montreal. Air Canada expected A220-300s to be 15% cheaper to operate per seat than the Embraer 190s they will replace.

 2020
During the height of the COVID-19 pandemic, the number of flights on many routes was reduced by more than 80% over the same period in 2019. The A220's features made it popular with airlines, as they preferred smaller aircraft with similar range and economic performance as larger ones, in order to keep the load factor high enough. Delta grounded their 62 A320s, for example, but continued to sell flights on their 31 A220-100 models and Swiss only operated 30% of their A320s but maintained flights on 45% of their 29 A220s.
Between May and December 2020, airBaltic operated all its flights with its A220-300s to minimize complexity. 
On 31 December 2020, JetBlue Airways took delivery of its first A220-300 from a total order of 70 aircraft to replace its Embraer 190 fleet.

 2021
By January 2021, airBaltic's A220 fleet had completed close to 60,000 flights over 141,000 block hours, carrying over 5.6 million passengers as it completed C checks on the first seven aircraft of its fleet.
On 22 April 2021, Air Manas received its first A220-300 of planned three aircraft to be based in Bishkek, Kyrgyzstan and became the first operator in the CIS states to introduce the A220.
On 26 May 2021, Swiss took delivery of its thirtieth and last A220 at Zurich Airport.
On 27 July 2021, Réunion Island-based Air Austral became the first French A220 operator after receiving its first A220-300 of three planned to replace its ATR 72-500 and Boeing 737-800 aircraft, to be operated to Mauritius, Mayotte, Seychelles, South Africa, Madagascar and India.
On 29 September 2021, Air France, the largest A220 customer in Europe, received its first A220-300 from an order for 60 aircraft, to be operated on the airline's medium-haul network with a 148 passengers single-class cabin.

From August 2020 to July 2021, the A220 average on-time performance (OTP) was 99%, led by Korean Air with 99.63%, giving the airline the "Airbus A220 Best Operational Excellence 2021" award on 4 October 2021, during IATA's Annual General Meeting.
On 17 December 2021, Breeze Airways, took delivery of its first A220-300, which was ferried from Airbus Mobile to Tampa International Airport.
On 29 December 2021, Air Senegal, the flag carrier of the Republic of Senegal. became the fourth A220 operator in Africa after receiving its first A220-300, which was delivered from Montreal via Paris to the carrier's home base in Dakar.

2022
On 7 January 2022, Iraqi Airways, the national carrier of Iraq, took delivery of its first out of five A220-300 aircraft from the Mirabel site. The airline began the type's commercial operation ten months later on 8 November 2022, becoming the second after Egyptair to operate the A220 in the MENA region.
On 6 May, Air Austral resumed its route between Réunion and Chennai that had been suspended at the height of the COVID-19 pandemic. At 2,870 nm, the flight is the world's longest A220 route, a record previously held by airBaltic's Riga–Dubai flight of 2,684 nm.
On 12 July, approximately six years after the type entered service, Airbus delivered the 220th A220 to JetBlue Airways, the type's largest customer.
In October, a batch of A220-300s originally destined for Russian airline Azimuth were delivered to ITA Airways (Italia Trasporto Aereo), the new Italian flag carrier, instead by their lessor. On 16 October, ITA Airways entered its new A220-300 into service on a maiden flight from Rome to Genoa. 
By December, the global A220 fleet had completed more than 680,000 flights over 1,100,000 block hours on more than 800 routes to 325 destinations with 98.8% operational reliability.

Dispatch reliability 
The clean sheet airliner was targeted to have a 99.0% dispatch reliability at entry into service. In August 2016, Swiss reported "much higher" reliability than other all-new airliners, citing Airbus's A320, A380 and Boeing's 787. After four months of service with Swiss, this goal seemed to have been met based on only three aircraft and 1,500 hours flown; "nuisance messages" from the integrated avionics suite and engine start-up delays had been the main griefs. Dispatch reliability rates of 99.0% were met in April 2017. A year after introduction, in July 2017, launch operators had fewer issues than expected for an all-new aircraft program. At this time point, airBaltic had already a 99.3–99.4% dispatch reliability, similar to the established Q400 but less than the relatively ubiquitous Boeing 737 Classic's 99.8%. The dispatch reliability improved further to 99.85% in October 2017.

Engine reliability 
Since the PW1500G mount generates less strain on the turbine rotor assembly than the A320neo's PW1100G, it does not suffer from start-up and bearing problems but still from premature combustor degradation. An updated combustor liner with a 6,000–8,000 hour limit has been developed and a third generation for 2018 will raise it to 20,000 hours in benign environments.

After three inflight engine failures in 2019, Transport Canada issued an emergency airworthiness directive (EAD) limiting the power to 94% of N1 (Low Pressure Spool rotational speed) above , disengaging the autothrottle for the climb over this altitude before engaging it again in cruise.

Maintenance 
The A check is scheduled after 850 flight hours: the check originally took 5 hours and has since been reduced to less than 3 hours, within an 8-hour shift. The C check is scheduled after 8,500 hours – translating to about 3.5 years of operation. Based on experience since product launch, A checks intervals could increase to 1,000 hours and C checks to 10,000 hours toward the end of 2019.

Variants
There are two main variants: the shorter A220-100 including the ACJ TwoTwenty business jet version, and the 3.7 metres longer A220-300. Their commonality over 99% allows a common spare part inventory, reducing investment and maintenance costs.

A220-100
The A220-100 is the shortest variant of the A220, seating typically between 100 and 130 passengers. Originally marketed by Bombardier as the CS100, it competes with the Embraer E190 and E195.

Marketing designation of the BD-500-1A10 for aircraft from serial number 50011.

A220-300
The A220-300 is the larger of the two A220, being 3.7 m (12.1 ft) longer than the -100, and carrying between 120 and 160 passengers. 

Since the acquisition of the program by Airbus, the A220-300 has been accused of cannibalizing sales from the A319neo. Given the two aircraft's striking similarities in size and range, and the lower operating costs of the A220 over the A319, it is likely that part of the low sales numbers of the latter jet can be attributed to the availability of the A220.

Marketing designation of the BD-500-1A11 for aircraft from serial number 55003.

ACJ TwoTwenty
The first delivery is expected in 2023.

Operators

Orders and deliveries

Accidents and incidents

Accidents (zero data) 
The A220 family has zero accidents to date.

Incidents (engine related) 

After three inflight shutdowns in July, September, and October 2019, Swiss International Air Lines temporarily withdrew its fleet for inspection.

Specifications

See also

Notes

References

External links

 
 
 
 
 
 
 
 
 

 
A220
A220
2010s Canadian airliners
Twinjets
Low-wing aircraft
Aircraft first flown in 2013